Brand-New Idol Shit  (stylized as Brand-new idol SHiT)  is the debut album by Japanese idol group Bish released through the independent label Sub Trax on May 27, 2015. The album is the first physical release by the group. Songs from the album were posted for streaming on SoundCloud little by little on the group's account. By the time the album was released all tracks except "BiSH -Hoshi ga Matataku Yoru ni-" (which was uploaded on YouTube), were available for streaming. The same songs were available for a limited time as free downloads on Ototoy.

Last minute departure of Yukako Love Deluxe
Yukako Love Deluxe left the group during the recording of this album, which lead to a rushed session in which her unrecorded parts were reassigned to other members. This is why her only contributions on the record are vocals on "Spark" and lyrics. In addition the cover art depicts a torn photo of the group with Watanabe. This came to be due to the lack of time staff had between Yukako's departure and the deadline for deciding on a design. They decided to rip Yukako from an existing photo, which became the final choice.

Track listing

Personnel
BiSH – Lyrics on Track 2
Cent Chihiro Chittiii – vocals; lyrics on Tracks 6 and 13
Aina the End – vocals; lyrics on Track 4
Momoko Gumi Company – vocals; lyrics on Tracks 7 and 9
Hug Mii – vocals; lyrics on Track 11
Ex. Bish
Yukako Love Deluxe – vocals on Track 1; lyrics on Tracks 3, 8 and 10

Notes
All writing, arrangement and personnel credits taken from the album insert.

References

2015 debut albums
BiSH albums